The 2003–04 Greek Basket League season was the 64th season of the Greek Basket League, the highest tier professional basketball league in Greece. It was also the 12th season of Greek Basket League championship that was regulated by HEBA (ESAKE). The winner of the league was Panathinaikos, which beat Maroussi in the league's playoff's finals series. The clubs Irakleio and Ilysiakos were relegated to the Greek A2 League, along with Peristeri, which was relegated because it faced financial problems. The top scorer of the league was Savvas Iliadis.

Teams

Regular season

Source: esake.gr, galanissportsdata.com

Playoffs

Finals

Final standings

Peristeri was relegated because of financial problems

References

External links
 Official HEBA Site
 Official Hellenic Basketball Federation Site
 HEBA Site, season 2003/04
  Galanis Sports Data 

Greek Basket League seasons
1
Greek